The 1968 United States presidential election in Georgia was held on November 5, 1968. American Independent Party candidate George Wallace received the most votes, and won all twelve of the state's electoral college votes.

Wallace, who ran a campaign based upon support for segregation, won all but seventeen of the state's 159 counties. Nixon won ten, all either suburban Atlanta counties or historically pro-Union counties of North Georgia. Despite Wallace's sweep of most of the state south of Atlanta, Cobb and DeKalb counties were two of only three amongst 210 Southern counties carried by Goldwater for the Republicans for the first time ever or since Reconstruction to vote for Nixon. The Voting Rights Act and subsequent enfranchisement of African-Americans allowed Humphrey to carry seven majority-black counties.

With 42.83% of the popular vote, Georgia would prove to be Wallace's fourth strongest state after Alabama, Mississippi, and Louisiana.

Results

Results by county

Notes

References

Georgia
1968
1968 in Georgia (U.S. state)